New Jazz Sounds is an album by American jazz saxophonist Benny Carter featuring trumpeter Dizzy Gillespie and trombonist Bill Harris recorded in 1954 and originally released on the Norgran label.

Reception

Allmusic awarded the album 2 stars.

Track listing
 "Just One of Those Things" (Cole Porter) - 6:08
 "Marriage Blues" (Benny Carter) - 7:41 
 "Angel Eyes" (Matt Dennis, Earl Brent) - 3:27 
 "That Old Black Magic" (Harold Arlen, Johnny Mercer) - 6:47
 "The Song Is You" (Jerome Kern, Oscar Hammerstein II) - 4:49 
 "This Can't Be Love" (Richard Rodgers, Lorenz Hart) - 3:27 
 "Frenesí" (Alberto Domínguez, Leonard Whitcup) - 4:42

Personnel 
 Benny Carter – alto saxophone
 Dizzy Gillespie (tracks 1 & 2) – trumpet
 Bill Harris (tracks 1-5) – trombone
 Oscar Peterson (tracks 1-5 & 7) – piano
 Don Abney (track 6) – piano
 Herb Ellis (tracks 1-5 & 7) – guitar
 Ray Brown (tracks 1-5 & 7) – double bass
 George Duvivier (track 6) – double bass
 Buddy Rich (tracks 1-5) – drums
 Louis Bellson (track 6) – drums
 Bobby White (track 7) – drums

References 

1955 albums
Benny Carter albums
Norgran Records albums
Verve Records albums
Albums produced by Norman Granz